Punta Sottile Lighthouse is an active lighthouse on the Favignana Island placed at the extremity of Punta Sottile, the westernmost point of the Island.

Description
The first lighthouse was built in 1860  and had the shape like a turret, it was managed by Civil Engineering of Palermo.

In 1904 was practically rebuilt in tuff from San Vito Lo Capo taking the current aspect of a tapered cylinder with balcony and lantern. Inside is a spiral staircase formed by 200 lead reinforced steps. The Regia Marina managed the lighthouse since 1912 and in 1935 the tower underwent to works in order to reduce its high to the present  . The light is operated by the Lighthouses Service of the Marina Militare and it is identified by the Country code number 3104 E.F.

See also
List of lighthouses in Italy

References

External links
 Servizio Fari Marina Militare 

Lighthouses in Italy